History of Mohammedanism is a work by Charles Mills.

This 19th-century book presents a biography of the prophet of Islam, and accounts of the empires founded by Muslims; an inquiry into the theological, moral, and judicial codes of the Islam, and the literature and sciences of the Saracens and Turks; with a view of the present extent and influence of Islam.

One edition was printed in London in 1818, there was also an 1817 version printed.

Non-Islamic Islam studies literature
1818 non-fiction books
Biographies of Muhammad